Hsieh Shu-ying and Hsieh Su-wei were the defending champions, having won the event in 2012, but Hsieh Su-wei chose not to participate. Hsieh Shu-ying paired up with Zhu Aiwen but lost in the first round to Li Ting and Zhang Kailin.

Miki Miyamura and Varatchaya Wongteanchai won the title, defeating Rika Fujiwara and Junri Namigata in the final, 7–5, 6–3.

Seeds

Draw

References 
 Draw

Wenshan - Doubles